John Alphons Pandeni (30 July 1950 – 14 March 2008) was a Namibian politician and trade unionist. A member of SWAPO, Pandeni was Minister of Regional and Local Government, Housing and Rural Development at the time of his death in 2008.

Early life
Pandeni was born in the village of Omundjalala in the Omusati Region of northern Namibia. After receiving military training in Tanzania and Angola, Pandeni was arrested in 1978 for anti-apartheid military activities with SWAPO's military wing, the People's Liberation Army of Namibia. Following his arrest, Pandeni was imprisoned on Robben Island until 1985. After his release, Pandeni became the founding Secretary of the Namibia Food and Allied Workers Union (Nafau) until 1992. In that year he entered politics, serving as Regional Councillor for Soweto constituency in Katutura, Windhoek. A year later he became the Khomas Regional Governor until 2005 when he entered President Hifikepunye Pohamba's first cabinet. He was a distant relative of fellow Robben Island prisoner turned SWAPO politician Petrus Iilonga.

Legacy
Pandeni is buried alongside other former liberation leaders at Heroes' Acre, outside of Windhoek.

References

 Hopwood, Graham. Guide to Namibian Politics, 2007 edition. Namibia Institute for Democracy, Windhoek, 2007

1950 births
2008 deaths
Namibian trade unionists
Prisoners and detainees of South Africa
Namibian prisoners and detainees
People's Liberation Army of Namibia personnel
SWAPO politicians
Government ministers of Namibia
Namibian independence activists
National heroes of Namibia
Inmates of Robben Island
Namibian people imprisoned abroad